Novice Lee "Nick" Nicholson (December 3, 1925 – September 29, 2010) was an American football player and coach.  He was the eighth head football coach at Abilene Christian University in Abilene, Texas, serving for six seasons, from 1956 to 1961, and compiling a record of 28–30–1.

Nicholson was born in Farmersville, Texas and grew up in Greenville.  He was co-captain of his high school's football team in 1943 before graduating in 1944 and serving in the United States Navy.  He played college football at Rice University, where he was selected to the 1945 All-Southwest Conference football team as a guard.  Nicholson earned a master's degree in education from North Texas State College—now known as the University of North Texas—in 1952.

Head coaching record

College

References

External links
 

1925 births
2010 deaths
American football guards
Abilene Christian Wildcats football coaches
Rice Owls football players
High school football coaches in Texas
United States Navy personnel of World War II
University of North Texas alumni
People from Farmersville, Texas
People from Greenville, Texas
Coaches of American football from Texas
Players of American football from Texas